This article documents statistics from the 1987 Rugby World Cup, hosted by New Zealand and Australia from 22 May to 20 June.

Team statistics
The following table shows the team's results in major statistical categories.

Source: ESPNscrum.com

Top point scorers

Top try scorers

Hat-tricks
Unless otherwise noted, players in this list scored a hat-trick of tries.

Stadiums

See also
 1991 Rugby World Cup statistics
 Records and statistics of the Rugby World Cup
 List of Rugby World Cup hat-tricks

External links
Rugby World Cup 1987 Tournament statistics
Rugby World Cup 1987 Team Stats

References

Statistics
Rugby union records and statistics